Kirikou is a 2001 platform video game based upon the 1998 French film Kirikou and the Sorceress. It was developed by Étranges Libellules for the PlayStation, Planet Interactive for the Game Boy Color and Krysalide for Microsoft Windows. It was published by Wanadoo Edition.

Scenario 
An evil sorceress named Karaba has inflicted terror upon the protagonist Kirikou's village and on the environment surrounding it. To ensure that her scheme for dominance over the region is fulfilled, she has transformed all the men of the village into fetiches. Kirikou's uncle, however, has managed to evade being transformed by Karaba's spell and has set out to combat Karaba by himself. Unbeknownst to him, though, Kirikou has decided to follow his uncle and join him in foiling Karaba's machinations.

Game systems 
Kirikou is a platform game in three dimensions where the progression is done on a plane in two dimensions in horizontal scrolling. The goal is to overcome the 7 levels by avoiding the fetishes and troughs in order to face Karaba the witch in the eighth and last level.

Levels 
The game is divided into eight levels whose end is marked by a hornbill (except the last level where it will face Karaba the witch):
 The village
 The savanna
 The marshlands
 The forest
 The big embankment
 The cave
 The rocky plateau
 The Karaba box

External links
 Kirikou at Microïds

2001 video games
Europe-exclusive video games
Game Boy Color games
Microïds games
Planet Interactive Development games
Platform games
PlayStation (console) games
Side-scrolling video games
Single-player video games
Video games about children
Video games based on films
Video games based on mythology
Video games developed in France
Video games featuring black protagonists
Video games set in Africa
Windows games
Étranges Libellules games